Ogburn Chapel Church is located in 1660 Ogburn Chapel Road, Clarksville, Montgomery County, Tennessee.

History 
The church was founded in 1865 by Rev. Fealand Quarles. It was reestablished in 1985 by Rev. Jimmy R. Bosley. It is named after the Ogburn family because they provided money and support to build the church. The current pastor is Rev. Lewis C. Thompson.

There are 134 interments in the cemetery behind the church.

Former Ministers
 Rev FormerGeorge Washington
 Rev Collins
 Rev Chilton
 Rev Jim Merriweather
 Rev Alex Kirks
 Rev Tyler
 Rev Ike Roberts
 Rev Elvan Roberts
 Rev Turner Paris
 Rev Howard Daniel Garrard (1890-1949)
 Rev Wash Grant
 Rev Taylor
 Rev Terry Metcalfe
 Rev E.H. Brown
 Rev George Babbs
 Rev Jimmy Bosley

References

External links
 Official website
 Cemetery at Find a Grave

Baptist churches in Tennessee
Churches in Clarksville, Tennessee